is a private university with the campus in Hirano-ku, Osaka, Osaka, Japan. It is located next to Tokiwakai College. It was established in 1999.

External links
 Official website 

Educational institutions established in 1999
Hirano-ku, Osaka
Private universities and colleges in Japan
Universities and colleges in Osaka Prefecture
1999 establishments in Japan